La Romana Casa De Campo International Airport  is an international airport located on the southeastern coast of the Dominican Republic, adjacent to the tourist town of La Romana and the resort of Casa de Campo. It is located about 68 miles (110 km) from the capital, Santo Domingo, approximately 1 hour and 34 minutes by car. In 2008, 374,724 passengers passed through the airport.

Overview
The current single terminal is built in the style of an old sugar mill. The airport consists of a main terminal with four modern gates. It has facilities for passengers and for the maintenance of aircraft. This airport receives most of the private flights in the country, principally businessmen that come to La Romana for vacations in Casa de Campo. The La Romana VOR/DME (Ident: LRN) and the La Romana non-directional beacon (Ident: LRN) are located on the field.

History
The current airport has been open for 22 years and opened in December 2000 and replaced the earlier La Romana Airport with the same name and IATA code. The former airport served private planes and one daily American Airlines flight from Miami and a few American Eagle flights.

Airlines and destinations

Statistics

See also 
Transport in Dominican Republic
List of airports in Dominican Republic
List of the busiest airports in Dominican Republic
List of the busiest airports in the Caribbean

References

External links
OpenStreetMap - La Romana Airport
 La Romana International Airport
 
 

La Romana, Dominican Republic
Airports in the Dominican Republic
Buildings and structures in La Romana Province
Airports established in 2000
2000 establishments in the Dominican Republic